VGCC may refer to:

 Voltage-gated calcium channel, also known as a voltage-dependent calcium channel
 Vance-Granville Community College, a community college in North Carolina
 Victoria Gardens Cultural Center,  a community library and performance venue in Rancho Cucamonga, California
 Video Game Collectors Community, an online community for video game collectors vgcc.ca